USS Roque (AG-137/AKL-8) was a Camano-class cargo ship constructed for the U.S. Army as USA FS-347 shortly before the end of  World War II and later acquired by the U.S. Navy in 1947. She was configured as a transport and cargo ship and was assigned to serve the World War II Trust Territories in the Pacific Ocean.

Constructed at Kewaunee, Wisconsin 
Roque, built in 1944 by the Kewaunee Ship Building Co., Kewaunee, Wisconsin, for the U.S. Army as freight supply ship FS-347, was acquired by the Navy at Subic Bay, Philippine Islands, 21 February 1947; renamed and reclassified Roque (AG-137) on 3 April 1947; and commissioned at Guam, 2 May 1947.

Pacific Trust Territory services 
On 11 June she relieved LSM-437 at Guam. She subsequently steamed on Pacific Ocean logistic and surveillance runs visiting various ports in the Mariana Islands, the Marshall Islands, the Caroline Islands, the Philippines, the Bonin Islands, the Admiralty Islands, and the Hawaiian Islands.

Roque was reclassified AKL-8 on 31 March 1949.

Transfer to the Interior Department
Completing her 4-year naval career, she was decommissioned at Guam 23 July 1951 and loaned to the U.S. Department of the Interior, then struck from the Navy List 29 January 1952 and transferred to the U.S. Department of the Interior for service in the Pacific Trust Territories.

Her subsequent fate is not known.

References
 
 NavSource Online: Service Ship Photo Archive - FS-347 - AG-137 / AKL-8 Roque

 

Ships of the United States Army
Design 381 coastal freighters
Ships built in Kewaunee, Wisconsin
1944 ships
World War II auxiliary ships of the United States
Camano-class cargo ships
Ships transferred from the United States Navy to the Trust Territory of the Pacific Islands